Taconic can refer to a location in the United States:

 Taconic, Connecticut, an unincorporated community in rural Litchfield County, Connecticut
 Taconic Correctional Facility, a medium security women's prison in Bedford Hills, New York
 Taconic Golf Club, a golf course in Williamstown, Massachusetts
 Taconic Mountains, part of the Appalachian Mountains, running through eastern New York, western Connecticut, western Massachusetts, and southwestern Vermont
 Taconic orogeny, a great mountain building period within the New York Bight region in the United States
 Taconic Shores, New York, a census-designated place
 Taconic State Park, New York state
 Taconic State Parkway, part of the New York State highway system
 Taconic Biosciences, a company providing laboratory animals for research purposes

See also
Taghkanic (disambiguation)